The Warrior-class ironclads were a class of two warships built for the Royal Navy between 1859 and 1862, the first ocean-going ironclads with iron hulls ever constructed. They were initially armed with a mix of rifled breech-loading and muzzle-loading smoothbore guns, but the Armstrong breech-loading guns proved unreliable and were ultimately withdrawn from service.

The ships spent their first commission with the Channel Fleet before being rearmed with new rifled muzzle-loading guns in the late 1860s.  rejoined the Channel Fleet after her refit while  joined the 1st Class Reserve and joined the fleet during its annual manoeuvres. The two ships exchanged roles after another refit in the mid-1870s. Both ships spent most of the last two decades of the 19th century in reserve. Warrior was hulked in 1902 and survived to be restored in 1979 as a museum ship. Black Prince became a training ship in 1896 and was hulked in 1910 before being sold for scrap in 1923.

Design and description
The Warrior-class ships have been described as revolutionary, but in truth they were more evolutionary than not as everything except their wrought iron armour had been in use by ocean-going ships for years. The naval architect and historian David K. Brown commented, "What made [Warrior] truly novel was the way in which these individual aspects were blended together, making her the biggest and most powerful warship in the world." They were designed in response to Gloire, which started an invasion scare in Britain, but they had a very different concept of operation to the French ship which was meant as a replacement for wooden ships of the line. They were designed by Chief Constructor of the Navy Isaac Watts as 40-gun armoured frigates largely based on the fine lines of the large frigate . Warrior and her sister Black Prince were not intended to stand in the line of battle as the Admiralty was uncertain about their ability to withstand concentrated fire from wooden two and three-deck ships of the line. Rather they were designed to be fast enough to force battle on a fleeing enemy and to control the range at which a battle was fought for their own advantage.

General characteristics
This was  longer than the Mersey, the longest wooden-hulled ship in the Royal Navy. The ships displaced . The hull was subdivided by watertight transverse bulkheads into 92 compartments and had a double bottom underneath the engine and boiler rooms.

Two bilge keels were fitted (the first used by the Royal Navy), which significantly reduced the roll of the ships. The Warrior-class ships trimmed down by the bow, not least because they were fitted with a  iron knee placed at the bow to give it a traditionally pleasing shape. This also prevented the ships from ramming any other ships. The bowsprit was shortened after completion in an effort to reduce the trim, but it was not noticeably successful.

Propulsion

The Warrior-class ships had one 2-cylinder trunk steam engine made by John Penn and Sons driving a single  propeller.

The lower masts were made of wood, but the other masts were iron. Warrior made  under sail, but Black Prince could only do . Under both sail and steam Warrior once logged . Both funnels were semi-retractable to reduce wind resistance while under sail alone. The ships' propellers could be hoisted up into the stern of the ship to reduce drag while under sail. They were the largest hoistable propellers ever made and required about 600 men to be raised.

Armament

The armament of the Warrior-class ships was intended to be 40 smoothbore, muzzle-loading 68-pounder guns, 19 on each side on the main deck and one each fore and aft as chase guns on the upper deck. This was modified during construction to ten rifled 110-pounder breech-loading guns, twenty-six 68-pounders, and four rifled breech-loading 40-pounder guns as saluting guns. The 40-pounder guns were to have been replaced by 70-pounder guns, but these failed their tests and were never issued. Both breech-loading guns were new designs from Armstrong and much was hoped for them. Four of the 110-pounder guns were installed on the main deck amidships and the other two became chase guns; all of the 68-pounder guns were mounted on the main deck. Firing tests carried out in September 1861 against an armoured target, however, proved that the 110-pounder was inferior to the 68-pounder smoothbore gun in armour penetration and repeated incidents of breech explosions during the Battles for Shimonoseki and the Bombardment of Kagoshima in 1863–1864 forestalled plans to completely equip the ships with the 110-pounder gun.

In 1863–1864 the 40-pounder guns were replaced by a heavier version with the same ballistics. All of the guns could fire both solid shot and explosive shells.

Both ships were rearmed during their 1867–1868 refit with a mix of 7- and  rifled muzzle-loading guns. Warrior received twenty-eight 7-inch and four 8-inch guns while Black Prince received four fewer 7-inch guns. Both ships received four 20-pounder breech-loading guns for use as saluting guns. It was credited with the nominal ability to penetrate  armour.

Armour

The ends of the ship were left entirely unprotected which meant that the steering gear was very vulnerable.

Construction
While the ships were being built the directing bar was developed which consisted of an iron bar that fastened to a pivot bolt in the sill of the gun port. After the gun carriages were modified, this allowed them to pivot much closer to the gun port than had previously been possible and meant that the gun ports could be narrowed to a width of  while retaining the same arc of fire. Another delay was the modification of the armour plates with tongue and groove joints to lock the plates together and increase their resistance to armour-piercing shells. All together these modifications delayed the completion of Warrior by a year past her contract completion date.

Service
HMS Warrior joined the Channel Fleet in July 1862 and was placed in ordinary from 1864 to 1867, during which time she was refitted. The ship rejoined the Channel Fleet in 1867 and towed a floating drydock to Bermuda in 1869 with her sister Black Prince. Warrior was placed in ordinary again from 1872 to 1875 and was modified with a poop deck. She was recommissioned into the 1st Class Reserve in 1875 and made periodic training cruises until 1883. The ship was formally reclassified as an armoured frigate in 1884, but was disarmed and mastless. The ship regained her original name in 1923 and was converted once more into an oil pipeline pier in 1927. Warrior was towed to Pembroke Dock in 1929 and was renamed C77 in 1942 to release her name for the new aircraft carrier . In 1979 C77 was moved to Hartlepool and was restored as HMS Warrior (1860) as the Fleet Headquarters in Northwood, London had assumed the name of HMS Warrior in the early 1960s. The ironclad can now be seen near  at Portsmouth Historic Dockyard.

Black Prince capsized while in dock at Greenock, damaging her masts. She arrived in Spithead in November 1861 with only jury-rigged fore and mizzenmasts. The ship was assigned to the Channel Fleet upon her completion and in 1867–68 she was rearmed and then assigned to the 1st Class Reserve. She was refitted in 1874 and given a poop deck, and rejoined the Channel Fleet in 1875 as the flagship of Rear Admiral Sir John Dalrymple-Hay, second in command of the fleet. Black Prince was placed in reserve in 1878 in Devonport until she was converted to a training ship in 1896 in Queenstown, Ireland and renamed Emerald in 1903. The ship was hulked and renamed Impregnable III in 1910 when she was assigned to the training school  before she was sold for scrap on 21 March 1923.

References

Bibliography

External links
 
 Portsmouth Historic Dockyard

Ironclad classes
Ship classes of the Royal Navy